Mali Vrh pri Šmarju is a settlement just northwest of Šmarje–Sap in the Municipality of Grosuplje in central Slovenia. The area is part of the historical region of Lower Carniola. The municipality is now included in the Central Slovenia Statistical Region.

Name
Mali Vrh was attested in historical sources as Wenigen perk in 1453. The name of the settlement was changed from Mali Vrh to Mali Vrh pri Šmarju in 1955.

Cultural heritage
Evidence of an Iron Age hillfort has been found on Vrhovka Hill northeast of the settlement.

References

External links

Mali Vrh pri Šmarju on Geopedia

Populated places in the Municipality of Grosuplje